Brighton is an unincorporated community in Lorain County, in the U.S. state of Ohio.

History
Some say the community was so named on account of it being a "bright spot", while others believe the name is a transfer from Brighton, New York, the native home of a share of the first settlers. A post office called Brighton was established in 1825, and remained in operation until 1904. The first country store at Brighton opened in around 1839.

References

Unincorporated communities in Lorain County, Ohio
Unincorporated communities in Ohio